Thom Rusnak is most known for playing bass for the hardcore bands Rorschach, Ambush (also as singer), and later for Kiss it Goodbye. Thom also recorded and toured with Playing Enemy, Evil Dean and Hunger, and played as a touring member with Poison Idea, King Black Acid, Cober and World Of Lies.

Bands 
 Evil Dean - bass, vocals (1986-1989)
 Rorschach (band) - bass (1989–1993, reunion 2009)
 Hunger - vocals, bass (1993)
 Ambush - vocals, bass (1994–1996)
 Hitler (1995-1996)
 Kiss it Goodbye (hardcore metal)  - bass (1995–1998)
 Playing Enemy (2001)
 Cober
 King Black Acid
 Poison Idea
 World Of Lies

References

External links
Tom Rusnak - Discogs.com
Rorschach - BandToBand.com
Shiny Grey Monotone Interview
Decibel Hall Of Fame

Year of birth missing (living people)
Living people
American rock bass guitarists
American male bass guitarists